Sanjay Mitra (born 1 March 1966) is an Indian actor who appears in Malayalam, Hindi, Bengali, and Telugu films.

Personal life
He married Suparna Anand, his co-star in Vaishali in 1997 and they have two sons, Manav Mitra (1999) and Bhavya Mitra (2001). However, they were divorced in 2008. He then remarried Taruna Mitra in 2010.

Career
He made his debut with the Malayalam film Vaishali, along with Suparna Anand. Years later, Mitra appeared in the Malayalam film Poonilamazha. His Telugu film Hrudayanjali had a delayed release in 2002, and received critical acclaim.

Filmography

Television

References

External links 
 

20th-century Indian male actors
Living people
Male actors in Malayalam cinema
Male actors in Hindi cinema
Indian male film actors
1966 births
21st-century Indian male actors
Male actors from Mumbai
Male actors in Telugu cinema